S9 may refer to:

Transportation
 SIAI S.9, a 1918 Italian flying boat 
 Aircraft registration prefix of São Tomé and Príncipe
 USS S-9 (SS-114), a 1920 S-class submarine of the United States Navy
 County Route S9 (California)
 Rans S-9 Chaos, a light aerobatic aircraft
 East African Safari Air's IATA code

Rail
 S9 (Berlin), an S-Bahn line
S9 (Milan suburban railway service)
 S9 (RER Vaud), an S-Bahn line in Switzerland
 S9 (Rhine-Ruhr S-Bahn)
 S9 (Rhine-Main S-Bahn)
 S9 (St. Gallen S-Bahn), an S-Bahn line in the canton of St. Gallen, Switzerland
 S9 (ZVV), an S-Bahn line in the cantons of Zürich and Zug in Switzerland
 Prussian S 9, a 1908 German steam-locomotive class
 Sri Lanka Railways S9, a diesel multiple-unit train
 S9, a Stadtbahn Karlsruhe line
 Line S9 (Nanjing Metro)

Other uses
 Samsung Galaxy S9, a smartphone by Samsung
 S9 (classification), a disability swimming classification
 S 9 (Abydos), an Ancient Egyptian tomb in Abydos, possibly that of pharaoh Neferhotep I
 S9: Keep container in a well-ventilated place, a safety protocol
 S9 fraction, a postmitochondrial liver fraction
 Cowon S9, a portable media player
 British NVC community S9, a swamps and tall-herb fens community in the British National Vegetation Classification system
 Motorola S9, a Motorola product
 S9, a district of the S postcode area in Sheffield, England
 S9, a termination record in Motorola's SREC (file format)
 S9, an allotrope of sulfur

See also
 S09, a quantum key distribution protocol
 HMS Oberon (S09), a 1961 British Royal Navy Oberon-class submarine
 Brave Fire S09, an Osamu Tezuka anime